Glenea multiguttata is a species of beetle in the family Cerambycidae. It was described by Félix Édouard Guérin-Méneville in 1843, originally under the genus Saperda. It is known from India. It feeds on Mangifera indica.

References

multiguttata
Beetles described in 1843